George Lazenby (October, 1807 – June 9, 1895) was an early settler of Western Australia, known for his cabinetmaking business and for being a Methodist preacher. He was superintendent of the first sunday school in the Colony. In the 1860s he built a house at Cardup, and established a flour mill and brick works—the latter continued in operation until the 1990s.

His elder daughter (of ten children) Hannah Boyd Lazenby married William Shakespeare Hall on 2 November 1868, and his younger daughter Jane Wesley Lazenby married Samuel John Rowe (son of Sub-Inspector of Police Thomas Rowe) on 21 January 1883. Another daughter married  King.

Lazenby died in June 1895 at his residence in Lake Street, Perth, and he was buried in the East Perth Cemeteries on 13 June.

References 

1807 births
1895 deaths
Settlers of Western Australia
Burials at East Perth Cemeteries